Dichomeris linealis is a moth in the family Gelechiidae. It was described by Kyu-Tek Park and Ronald W. Hodges in 1995. It is found in Taiwan.

The length of the forewings is about 7.4 mm. The forewings are light brown with a yellowish-white postmedian line and a yellowish-white strigula at three-fourths of the anterior margin.

References

Moths described in 1995
linealis